Husen is a surname and notable people with the surname include:

 Katja Husen (1976–2022), German biologist and politician
 Mohamed Husen (born Mahjub bin Adam Mohamed; 1904–1944), Afro-German soldier
 Najir Husen, known as Najir Husen, (born 1990), Nepalese film actor
 Torsten Husén (1916–2009), Swedish educator and scholar

German-language surnames